Mao Kobayashi may refer to:
 Mao Kobayashi (actress) (1982–2017), Japanese newscaster and actress
 Mao Kobayashi (footballer) (born 1999), Japanese football player
 Mao Kobayashi (model) (born 1992), Japanese model